The U.S. state of South Dakota first required its residents to register their motor vehicles in 1905. Registrants provided their own license plates for display until 1913, when the state began to issue plates.

, plates are issued by the South Dakota Department of Revenue through its Motor Vehicle Division. Front and rear plates are required for most classes of vehicles, while only rear plates are required for motorcycles and trailers.

Passenger baseplates

Prestate

1913 to 1975
The 1955 (dated 1956) issue was the first South Dakota license plate that complied with these standards.

1976 to present

Non-passenger plates

2006 to present

Optional plates

County coding

References

External links
South Dakota license plates, 1969–present

South Dakota
Transportation in South Dakota
South Dakota transportation-related lists